Addison Municipal Airport  is a city-owned, public-use airport located one mile (2 km) northeast of the central business district of Addison, a city in Winston County, Alabama, United States. It is located at coordinates .

Facilities and aircraft 
For the 12-month period ending April 5, 2000, the airport had 1,416 general aviation aircraft operations, an average of 118 per month.

References

External links 

Airports in Alabama
Transportation buildings and structures in Winston County, Alabama